Maurice Hugh-Sam (born 17 February 1955) is a Jamaican former cyclist. He competed in the sprint and team pursuit events at the 1972 Summer Olympics.

References

External links
 

1955 births
Living people
Jamaican male cyclists
Olympic cyclists of Jamaica
Cyclists at the 1972 Summer Olympics
Place of birth missing (living people)